Badrul Hisyam bin Abdul Manap (born 2 January 1997) in Batu Gajah, Merlimau, Melaka is a Malaysian competitive runner, competing in events ranging from 100 m to 400 m. He was the former Malaysian 100 m outdoor record holder with a time of 10.29 seconds. The wind measurement was a tailwind of 1.92 metres a seconds, within the legal limit of 2.0 m/s.

At the age of 18, Badrul won the 100 m, 200 m and the 4 × 100 m relay titles at the 2015 ASEAN School Games. Just before the meet in Brunei, Badrul displayed his potential in October 2015 when he became the country's fastest 200 m runner ever posting 20.88 seconds at the UniMAP Open in Arau, faster than Mani Jegathesan's 1968 record of 20.92s. Unfortunately for Badrul, the time was set with a tailwind exceeding 2.0 m/s and cannot be recognised as a record.

Badrul grew up in Merlimau, Malacca, where he took part in futsal and badminton, before his sprinting prowess was discovered.

References

External links
 
 Badrul Hisham Abdul Manap profile at all-athletics.com

1997 births
Living people
People from Malacca
Malaysian male sprinters
Malaysian people of Malay descent
Malaysian Muslims
Athletes (track and field) at the 2018 Commonwealth Games
Commonwealth Games competitors for Malaysia